Nie wieder ("Never again") may refer to:

"Nie wieder Faschismus", part of the words on Hitler birthplace memorial stone
"Nie wieder", a 1993 song from Austria in the Eurovision Song Contest 1993
"Nie wieder", a 1998 song by Böhse Onkelz from Kneipenterroristen
"Nie wieder", a 2004 song by Bushido from Electro Ghetto

See also
Nie wieder Liebe, 1931 German musical comedy film
Never Again (disambiguation)

German words and phrases